Amsterdam Guitar Trio is a classical guitar ensemble consisting of Johan Dorrestein, Olga Franssen and Helenus de Rijke, who met while they were students at the Sweelinck Conservatory (Sweelinck Conservatorium). Their discography includes transcriptions for Antonio Vivaldi's The Four Seasons and the Johann Sebastian Bach's Brandenburg concertos.

Discography

Vivaldi: The Four Seasons (1983)
J.S. Bach: Brandenburg Concertos Nos. 2, 3, 5, 6 (1985)
Amsterdam Guitar Trio Plays Music by Debussy, Fauré, & Chopin (1988)
Fandango (1991)
Domenico Scarlatti: Sonatas for three Guitars (1993)
Brandenburg Ctos 2 & 3 & 5 & 6 / Suite Bergamasque (Double album compiling the 1985 and 1988 releases, 2012)

External links
Discography at MusicBrainz, visited 2014-11-02.
"Amsterdam Guitar Trio Brings Unique Sound to Schoenberg Hall," Los Angeles Times, February 24, 1997

References

Classical guitar ensembles
Dutch classical guitarists